Senator McDonough may refer to:

Frank McDonough (politician) (1846–1904), Wisconsin State Senate
Peter McDonough (1925–1998), New Jersey State Senate